Mount Meader, elevation , is a mountain in the Baldface-Royce Range, located in Coos County, New Hampshire. It is reached by the Basin Rim, Mount Meader, and Meader Ridge trails. It is flanked to the southwest by Eagle Crag, and to the northeast by West Royce Mountain.

References

Mountains of Coös County, New Hampshire
Mountains of New Hampshire